{{safesubst:#invoke:RfD||2=Eclipse of God|month = February
|day = 18
|year = 2023
|time = 22:16
|timestamp = 20230218221645

|content=
REDIRECT Death of God theology

}}